The 2017 Savannah State Tigers football team represented Savannah State University in the 2017 NCAA Division I FCS football season. The Tigers were members of the Mid-Eastern Athletic Conference (MEAC). They were led by second-year head coach Erik Raeburn and played their home games at Ted Wright Stadium. They finished the season 3–8, 3–5 in MEAC play to finish in seventh place.

Schedule

Source: Schedule

Game summaries

at Appalachian State

at Montana

Florida A&M

at Bethune–Cookman

Hampton

at Morgan State

at Charleston Southern

at Norfolk State

Delaware State

at North Carolina A&T

South Carolina State

References

Savannah State
Savannah State Tigers football seasons
Savannah State Tigers football